Torgeir Vassvik (born 3 October 1962 in Gamvik, Sápmi) is a Norwegian Sami musician and composer. Vassvik combines Joik with drum and traditional instruments,.

Discography
Sáivu, (Iđut 2006), producer Arve Henriksen
Sápmi, (Iđut 2009), producer Jan Martin Smørdal
Gákti, (Heilo 2019), producer Torgeir Vassvik, Babette Michel

References

External links

Torgeir Vassvik at folkemusikk.no (in Norwegian)
Review of Sápmi at Inside World Music
Review of Sáivu at All about jazz

Norwegian folk singers
Norwegian Sámi people
Norwegian Sámi musicians
People from Gamvik
1962 births
Living people